Emma Taylor (born 9 July 1992) is a Canadian rugby union player.

Taylor competed for Canada at the delayed 2021 Rugby World Cup in New Zealand. She featured in the Pool games against Japan and Italy. Her last World Cup match was in the third place final against France.

References 

Living people
1992 births
Female rugby union players
Canadian female rugby union players
Canada women's international rugby union players